Drax Abbey railway station was a station on the Hull and Barnsley Railway, and served the village of Drax in North Yorkshire, England.

The station opened on 27 July 1885 and closed on 1 January 1932.

References

External links
 Drax Abbey station on navigable 1947 O.S. map

Disused railway stations in North Yorkshire
Railway stations in Great Britain opened in 1885
Railway stations in Great Britain closed in 1932
Former Hull and Barnsley Railway stations